Petar Turković (born 1 November 1957) is a Croatian clinical psychologist, psychotherapist, social entrepreneur, master of martial arts, and sports executive. He was a long-time Vinko Bek Education Centre director and Croatian Olympic Committee vice president. Currently, he serves as the executive director of the Croatian Nanbudo Federation and the Croatian Wushu Federation, as well as the general secretary of the International Nanbudo Federation and the European Wushu Federation.

Family and education 
Petar Turković was born on 1 November 1957 in Zagreb, PR Croatia, Yugoslavia (now Croatia). He comes from the Turković baronial family of Kutjevo. His great-great-grandfather Vjenceslav was a successful wood and grain merchant in Karlovac in the second half of the 19th century. He also advanced the operations of the inherited Kraljevica Shipyard and bought the agricultural Kutjevo Estate in 1882. His great-grandfather Baron Petar Dragan was one of the founders and chairman of Croatian Eskompt Bank and founder and chairman of brewery Zagrebačka pivovara. He was also the grand prefect of Zagreb County. His another great-grandfather was Ritter , a Slovenian industrialist, politician, and patron.

Turković earned his degree in clinical psychology from the University of Zagreb in 1981 and his master's degree in psychotherapy in 1994. In addition, he obtained degrees in organizational psychology and cybernetics. He is one of the first certified teachers of the School of Cybernetics of Psychotherapy at the University Hospital Centre Zagreb.

Turković is married with two daughters, Nika (born 1995) and Kiara (born 1999). A singer-songwriter, Nika released two studio albums as of 2023 and represented Croatia at the Junior Eurovision Song Contest in 2004. Kiara is a nanbudo practitioner and won a gold medal in an individual kata event at the 2022 Nanbudo World Championship.

Professional career 
After completing his studies in psychology, Turković commenced his career as a psychotherapist at health centres in Velika Gorica and Zagreb, where he served until 1990. He then served as a human resources officer at Chromos, a Croatian paints and coatings manufacturer, for two years.

From 1992 to 2005, Turković held the director position at the Vinko Bek Education Centre. In 1992, he initiated the Sight of Hope project, initially as director and subsequently as president of the administrative board. The project involved the establishment of a social welfare institution called Mala Kuća to cater to visually impaired children. The institution has since expanded into a daycare centre known as Mali Dom. Turković managed this center until 2005.

In 1997, Turković received the Homeland War Memorial Medal. Two years later, he was appointed an advisor to Croatian politician Stjepan Mesić and served as campaign co-manager during the 2000 Croatian presidential election. Mesić's successful campaign resulted in him becoming the second President of Croatia. For several years, Turković was a participant and facilitator in Forums organized by the Tällberg Foundation from Sweden.

In 1999, Turković established and served as director of the Foundation 2020, a Croatian think tank dedicated to envisioning the future of Croatian society. In the initial years of the Foundation's work, Turković led Creatia Croatia 2010 project, which focused on the strategic planning of Croatia's future. As part of this project, Turković organized an international conference in Brijuni in 2004, titled How We Can Trust Each Other, which was attended by statesmen such as Croatian President Mesić, Slovenian President Janez Drnovšek, President of the Presidency of Bosnia and Herzegovina Sulejman Tihić, and President of Montenegro Filip Vujanović. In 2006, Turković organized another conference in Plitvička Jezera entitled How Croatian Economy Can Contribute to European Union. He headed the Foundation 2020 until 2016 when he worked towards realizing its vision of collaboration and innovation.

Sports career

Martial arts 
Turković began his martial arts career in 1971 when he started practising karate. After five years, he won a gold medal at the Karate Junior Championship of SR Croatia. He has a 3rd-degree black belt in karate. After karate, he shifted his focus to promoting and developing  and wushu in Croatia.

Nanbudo

Turković founded the Gradec Nanbudo Club in Zagreb in 1978, named after the old part of Zagreb. It was the first nanbudo sports club in Croatia. In 1985, he organized the first international nanbudo seminar in Croatia, which will continue to be organized yearly. He also achieved the 8th-degree red belt and earned the honorific title Hanshi. Turković competed in the first Nanbudo World Championship in Monte Carlo, Monaco, in 1987, after which he retired from his competitive career. 

In 1989, after establishing two additional clubs in Croatia, the requirements were met for forming a national federation. Initially known as the Yugoslav Nanbudo Institute, the organization was later renamed the Croatian Nanbudo Institute following Croatia's declaration of independence. Eventually, it came to be known as the Croatian Nanbudo Federation. One of the founders of the federation, Turković, was appointed as its executive director. In 1991, the Croatian federation became a member of the World Nanbudo Federation, facilitating its participation in global competitions. Turković led the Croatian national team, which took part in the World Championship in Barcelona, Spain, in 1991 as the first Croatian team to compete under their flag and name. The team's outstanding performance saw them win one silver and three gold medals, a remarkable achievement for a fledgling national team.

Turković's contribution to nanbudo extended beyond Croatia's borders when he was elected as the general secretary of the World Nanbudo Federation in 1998, serving until 2003. In 2010, he participated in founding the International Nanbudo Federation and was elected as its secretary-general.

Turković wrote two books about the nanbudo sport.

Wushu
In 2008, Turković was one of the founders of the Croatian Wushu Federation and was appointed executive director thereof. Within the framework of the federation, he successfully headed two projects that were financed by the European Erasmus Programme.

In 2013, Turković participated in the founding of the Balkan Regional Wushu Federation and was elected its vice president at the constituent session in Istanbul, Turkey. He also participated in the founding of the European Wushu Federation in 2020 and was appointed secretary-general.

Other 

Besides martial arts, Turković did kart racing and won several titles in this motorsport. He won the Croatian Karting Championship title twice, in 1981 and 1982 and became a runner-up in 1995.

Moreover, Turković's contributions to sports in Croatia extend beyond his achievements. From 2000 to 2002, he served as the vice president of the Croatian Olympic Committee (HOO). In 2022, at the 19th Winter Olympic Games in Salt Lake City, he was a NOC member with the Croatian delegation.

Turković's expertise and experience in sports led him to be appointed by Croatian President Stjepan Mesić as the head of the group responsible for drafting proposals for Croatian sports strategy in 2000. He collaborated with distinguished sportspeople such as Andrija Mijačika, Željko Mataja, and Mihovil Nakić.

In 2015, Turković also played a significant role in forming SportREcognized, an association of international sports federations, where he serves as the vice president.

Bibliography 
 Centar "Vinko Bek": 1895–1995.; English translation: Vinko Bek Center: 1895–1995; editor Petar Turković, (1997, Zagreb)
 Uvod u nanbudo: vještina, šport, zdrav stil života; English translation: Introduction to Nanbudo: Skill, Sport, Healthy Lifestyle; (1997, Zagreb)
 Nanbudo: 40 godina Nanbudo kluba Gradec i nanbudo sporta u Hrvatskoj; English translation: Nanbudo: 40 years of Gradec Nanbudo Club and nanbudo sport in Croatia; (2018, Zagreb)

References

External links 
 Turković Petar, 40 years of nanbudo (1978–2018): Platform for sustainable future

1957 births
Living people
Businesspeople from Zagreb
Barons of Croatia
Croatian alpine skiing coaches
Cyberneticists
Croatian psychologists
Croatian male martial artists
Croatian male karateka
Croatian sports executives and administrators
Human resource management people
Clinical psychologists
Physicians from Zagreb
Social entrepreneurs
Sportspeople from Zagreb
Turković family
Yugoslav male martial artists